Arthur Green (1885 – after 1911) was an English professional footballer who played in the Football League for Birmingham. Born in Grantham, Lincolnshire, he began his football career with Seaton Main and Mansfield Town before joining Birmingham in July 1911. He made his debut in the Second Division on 21 October 1911 away at Gainsborough Trinity, stepping in at left back to allow regular incumbent Frank Womack to replace the injured Billy Ball at right back. The game finished goalless, and was the only first-team appearance he made for Birmingham. In 1912 he signed for Lincoln City, but returned to Mansfield without playing first-team football.

References

1885 births
Year of death missing
People from Grantham
English footballers
Association football fullbacks
Mansfield Town F.C. players
Birmingham City F.C. players
Lincoln City F.C. players
English Football League players
Date of birth missing